Hottentotta jalalabadensis is a species of scorpion of the family Buthidae. It was first found in Afghanistan.

References

Further reading

Teruel, Rolando, and Jan Ove Rein. "A new Hottentotta Birula, 1908 from Afghanistan, with a note on the generic position of Mesobuthus songi Lourenço, Qi et Zhu, 2005 (Scorpiones: Buthidae)." Euscorpius 2010.94 (2016): 1-8.
Lowe, Graeme. "Two new species of Hottentotta Birula, 1908 (Scorpiones: Buthidae) from Northern Oman." Euscorpius 2010.103 (2015): 1-23.

Buthidae
Animals described in 2007
Scorpions of Asia